Laura Coenen (born October 16, 1962) is a former American basketball and handball player who competed in the latter sport in the 1988 Summer Olympics, in the 1992 Summer Olympics, and in the 1996 Summer Olympics.

Coenen was born in Neenah, Wisconsin. Before switching to handball, she had been a basketball star at the University of Minnesota, where she won the inaugural Big Ten Conference Player of the Year award in 1983.

References

External links
 
 

1962 births
Living people
Sportspeople from Neenah, Wisconsin
American female handball players
Olympic handball players of the United States
Handball players at the 1988 Summer Olympics
Handball players at the 1992 Summer Olympics
Handball players at the 1996 Summer Olympics
Minnesota Golden Gophers women's basketball players
Medalists at the 1995 Pan American Games
Medalists at the 1987 Pan American Games
Pan American Games gold medalists for the United States
Pan American Games medalists in handball